Suwi is a 2010 Zambian film  written and directed by Musola Cathrine Kaseketi and co-directed by Sandie Banda.

Plot 
The movie gives insight of a young lady who had accident leaving her to be handicapped, she later found love with a person living with AIDS of which made her happy.

Cast
 Catherine Soko 
 Chantel Mwabi 
 Owas Ray Mwape 
 Jacob Chirwa 
 Charity Chanda Mwamba 
 Emmanuel Chishimba 
 Mrs. Chishimba 
 Kangwa Chileshe 
 Chenayi Moyo 
 Emma Mukwasa 
 Boyd Nyirenda 
 Masuthu Kalinda 
 Felix Kalima 
 Melisa Wakoli 
 Sharon-Rose Wakoli

References

External links 
 

Zambian drama films
2010 films